Aethalopteryx kisangani is a moth in the family Cossidae. It is found in Zaire.

References

Moths described in 2011
Aethalopteryx